Events from the year 1640 in art.

Events
 Nicolas Poussin completes the first series of Seven Sacraments.
 Abraham van Linge begins painting the windows for the chapel of University College, Oxford.
 Opening of the iconography studio at the Kremlin Armoury.

Paintings

Govert Flinck - A Young Archer (c.1639-40)
Giovanna Garzoni - Still Life with Bowl of Citrons
Jacob Jordaens (approximate dates)
The King Drinks
Prometheus Bound
Rembrandt
Harmen Doomer
Portrait of an Elderly Woman in a White Bonnet
Self-portrait
Guido Reni - Saint Joseph and the Christ Child
Diego Velázquez - Mars Resting (Prado Museum)

Births
June 21 - Abraham Mignon, Dutch flower painter born at Frankfurt (died 1679)
August 2 - Gérard Audran, French engraver of the Audran family (died 1703)
September 11 (or 1641) - Gerard de Lairesse, Dutch Golden Age painter and art theorist (died 1711)
September 29 - Antoine Coysevox, French sculptor who emigrated from Spain (died 1720)
date unknown
Filippo Abbiati, Italian painter (died 1715)
Jean François Baudesson, French painter of flowers and fruit (died 1713)
Giovanni Lorenzo Bertolotti, Italian painter, active in Genoa (died 1721)
Jacques d'Agar, French portrait painter (died 1716)
Henry Gyles, English glass painter (died 1709)
Buhurizade Mustafa Itri, Ottoman-Turkish musician, composer, calligrapher, singer and poet (died 1712)
Isaac Paling, Dutch Golden Age painter (died 1728)
Jose Risueño,  Spanish painter who helped decorate the cupola of the church in the Carthusian monastery (died 1721)
probable
Giovanni Ventura Borghesi, Italian painter, active mainly in Rome (died 1708)
Marco Liberi, Italian painter of mythologic and historic cabinet paintings (died 1687)

Deaths
January - Johann Wilhelm Baur, German engraver, etcher and miniature painter (born 1607)
January 8 - Alfonso Rivarola, Italian painter, active mainly in his native Ferrara (born 1607)
February 4 (bur.) - Hendrick Cornelisz Vroom, Dutch painter (born 1566), father of Cornelis Hendriksz Vroom
May 30 - Peter Paul Rubens, Flemish painter (born 1577)
June - Abraham van der Doort, Dutch-born artist and curator (born c. 1575/1580?) (suicide)
July 3 - Giuseppe Cesari, Italian painter (born 1568)
August 3 - Giovanni Antonio Lelli, Italian painter of the Baroque period (born 1591)
September 30 - Jacopo da Empoli, Italian late-mannerist painter (born 1551)
October 26 - Pietro Tacca, Italian sculptor and follower of Giambologna (born 1557)
November 22 - Mario Minniti, Italian painter, who was also the model for Caravaggio's painting Boy with a Basket of Fruit  (born 1577)
November 25 - Pellegrino Piola, Italian painter (born 1617)
December 22 - Jean de Beaugrand, French lineographer and mathematician (born 1584)
date unknown
Vicente Guirri, Spanish painter (date of birth unknown)
Giovanni Battista Ruggieri, Italian painter (date of birth unknown)
probable
Antonia Bertucci-Pinelli, Italian woman painter (date of birth unknown)
Ercole de Maria, Italian painter awarded knighthood by Urban VIII (b. unknown)

 
Years of the 17th century in art
1640s in art